Aspidodiadema arcitum is a species of sea urchin of the family Aspidodiadematidae. Their armour is covered with spines. It is placed in the genus Aspidodiadema and lives in the sea. Aspidodiadema arcitum was first scientifically described in 1939 by Ole Theodor Jensen Mortensen, a Danish scientist.

References 

arcitum
Animals described in 1939
Taxa named by Ole Theodor Jensen Mortensen